Gavieze Parish is an administrative unit of South Kurzeme Municipality in the Courland region of Latvia. The parish has a population of 925 (as of 1/07/2010) and covers an area of 128.9 km2.

Villages of Gavieze parish 
 Gavieze
 Gaviezes stacija
 Kradzes
 Mazgavieze
 Susta
 Vārtāja

Parishes of Latvia
South Kurzeme Municipality
Courland